This is the complete episode list for the U.S. TV series Mr. Belvedere, which spanned 6 seasons. There were 7 episodes made for season 1, and 22 episodes made for each subsequent season. A total of 117 episodes in the 6 seasons were produced for the ABC television network from 1985 to 1990, with some episodes being shelved by ABC, only to make their debut in off-network syndication. Each episode was videotaped before a live audience at ABC Television Center (now The Prospect Studios) in Hollywood, CA, (Sunset Gower Studios in the Pilot and Season 1) utilizing a multi-camera setup, though some episodes occasionally did on-location shoots. Also occasionally, the show did multi-part episodes. There were three in total (one from season 3, one from season 4, and one from season 6), and all of them were two-parts long.

All episodes are arranged in the order of first television airing. Information on ratings for first-run airings, for all but 10 episodes, came from Broadcasting Magazine.

Tape dates (whenever available) have been compiled from various scripts, and other production materials online.

Series overview

Broadcast History
 March 1985–April 1985, ABC Friday 8:30–9:00
 August 1985–March 1987, ABC Friday 8:30–9:00
 May 1987–September 1987, ABC Friday 8:30–9:00
 October 1987–January 1988, ABC Friday 9:00–9:30
 January 1988–February 1988, ABC Friday 8:30–9:00
 March 1988–July 1989, ABC Friday 9:00–9:30
 August 1989–September 1989, ABC Friday 8:30–9:00
 September 1989–December 1989, ABC Saturday 8:00–8:30
 July 1990, ABC Sunday 8:30–9:00

Episodes

Season 1 (1985)
The series began its run on ABC on Friday nights at 8:30 P.M. It left the schedule after April 26, 1985, and was replaced by a short-lived summer-replacement series called The Comedy Factory. The show returned on August 16, 1985, with reruns of select season 1 episodes, and season 2 began the following month. The plot events are described, below, using in-universe tone. When the series began, George was a sportswriter, Marsha was in law school, Kevin was a sophomore in high school, Heather was in junior high, and Wesley was in elementary school. The Pilot and the six season 1 episodes were directed by Tony Sheehan.

The Pilot was taped on January 9, 1985; all six season 1 episodes were taped from February–April of that same year.

Season 2 (1985–86) 
All of seasons 2 and 3 were directed by Noam Pitlik. All 22 episodes of Season 2 were taped from August 1985 – March 1986.

Season 3 (1986–87)
The show left ABC on March 6, 1987, and was briefly replaced by the first season of The Charmings two weeks later. The remaining three episodes of this particular season aired from May 1–15, 1987. Afterwards, reruns of select season 3 episodes aired until September 11, 1987. All 22 episodes of Season 3 were taped from August 1986 – March 1987.

Season 4 (1987–88)
During this season, they alternated between Alan Bergmann, Michael Zinberg, Gerren Keith, Howard Storm, Don Corvan, Tony Singletary, and Tony Sheehan as directors, until it was decided that Don Corvan should be the new permanent director. The 4th season began airing on October 30, 1987, at 9:00 P.M., which was previously occupied by Max Headroom. The show would stay there until January 8, 1988. Afterwards, the show moved to 8:30 P.M., a timeslot that was previously occupied by I Married Dora (and was also its original timeslot during its first three seasons). The show would stay there until February 12, 1988. Lastly, on March 4, 1988, the show moved into the 9:00 P.M. timeslot, which was previously occupied by the short-lived sitcom The Thorns. This season featured two episodes that were held over until season 5 ("The Book" and "Black Widow"). During this season, George would finally get a job as a sportscaster, Marsha would finally graduate from law school and start a career as a lawyer, Kevin would enroll in College and get a new apartment, Heather would move on further in High School, and Wesley would graduate from Elementary school.

All 22 episodes of Season 4 (including the two leftover episodes that aired during season 5) were taped from June 1987 – February 1988.

Season 5 (1988–89)
During this season, Mr. Belvedere was one of the four original shows on ABC's then newly established TGIF block, which began during this season, along with Perfect Strangers, Full House, and Just the Ten of Us. Because of the 1988 Writers Guild of America strike, season 5, along with the rest of the 1988/89 primetime season, began in October. "The Book" and "Black Widow", two season 4 leftovers, aired during this season. After May 5, 1989, reruns of select episodes from select seasons aired in the 9:00 P.M. timeslot, until July 28. A week later, the show moved into the 8:30 P.M. timeslot. It would stay there until September 1, 1989. A week later, the show moved to Saturday nights at 8:00 P.M., and its original 8:30 P.M. timeslot was soon given to a new ABC sitcom called Family Matters. There were two episodes ("The Dinner" and "The Attic") that, for some reason, were shelved by ABC until syndication in 1990.

All 22 episodes of season 5 (not counting the two season 4 leftovers) were taped from August 1988 – March 1989.

Season 6 (1989–90)
This was the final season for Mr. Belvedere. Due to rapidly declining ratings (which already were not high to begin with), after 12 episodes, ABC quickly shelved the series, along with eight episodes. After much speculation that the show had been cancelled, ABC decided to arrange for a special airing of the two-part series finale on July 1–8, 1990 at 8:30 P.M. Part 1 of the series finale was co-directed by Rob Stone (who does not appear in it, but does appear in part 2) and Don Corvan. The eight episodes that ABC shelved would eventually make their debut in syndication in 1991.

All 22 episodes of the 6th and final season of Mr. Belvedere were taped from August 1989 – March 1990.

Home media
At present, the first four seasons have been released on DVD by Shout! Factory, in three box sets.

References

External links
 All episodes arranged by production order

Mr. Belvedere